Avelgem is a municipality located in the Belgian province of West Flanders. The municipality comprises the towns of Avelgem proper, Bossuit, Kerkhove, Outrijve and Waarmaarde. On January 1, 2006, Avelgem had a total population of 9,457. The total area is 21.75 km² which gives a population density of 435 inhabitants per km².

It has a famous building named 'Spikkerelle', where people can watch movies, theater, exhibitions and there's a room which can be organized into partying.

Notable people
 Bert De Graeve, (b. 1955 in Avelgem), businessman
 Marc Demeyer, (b. 1950 in Avelgem), cyclist
Joost van Eeden, (b. 1991 in Leiden), roots
André Decoster, (b. 1959 in Avelgem), Economist

References

External links

Official website  - Available only in Dutch

 
Municipalities of West Flanders